Rembert Wurlitzer Co. was a distinguished firm in New York City that specialized in fine musical instruments and bows.

Founded in Europe in 1856, the Wurlitzer Co. was a world-famous musical instrument company known for its many ateliers in the United States.

Rembert Rudolph Wurlitzer (1904–1963), violin expert and a grandson of the founder of Chicago's Wurlitzer Co. (pianos, organs, jukeboxes), bowed out of the family firm in 1949 to found Manhattan's Rembert Wurlitzer Co., which has  bought, sold, authenticated and or restored more than half the world's 600 known Stradivariuses, and supplied instruments to Fritz Kreisler, David Oistrakh and Isaac Stern among others.

"Wurlitzer had built up a first-class workshop inviting the great Simone Fernando  Sacconi and his pupil Dario D'Attilli, where many of the best American repairers were trained in. In his last years Sacconi spent much time teaching in  Cremona, Italy, and published I segreti di Stradivari (Cremona, 1972), setting out in detail Stradivari’s working methods."

They amassed a very important collection of the finest instruments (of the violin family) which included  Antonio Stradivarius, Giuseppe Guarneri, Domenico Montagnana, Sanctus Serafin, Lorenzo Storioni, Francesco Ruggeri, Joannes Baptista Guadagnini, Nicolas Lupot,  J. B. Vuillaume to name a few, as well as an important fine bow collection including bows by François Tourte, Dominique Peccatte, Nicolaus Kittel, Jean Pierre Marie Persois and many others. Most importantly was the acquisition of the Henry Hottinger Collection in 1967.

"He (Henry Hottinger) had an early interest in the violin, and bought his first Stradivari in 1935. His ambition after the war was to acquire one outstanding example of each of the old  Cremonese masters, and in the case of Stradivari and Guarneri  ‘del Gesù’, one example from each significant period of their production. 
An illustrated catalogue (R. Wurlitzer: The Henry Hottinger Collection, 1967)  was published following the collection's sale to Rembert Wurlitzer Co. (the most highly regarded string instrument dealership of its day). 
The instruments (about 30 violins in all) were subsequently dispersed all over the world."

This  shop became a leading international centre for rare string instruments  and was patronized by many of the preeminent names in the concert world.
From the turn of the century, the shop also imported many fine instruments made by the best contemporary makers of Europe (at the time)  including Albert Nürnberger, whom they  represented  as "the greatest modern bow maker" (c. 1912).

Quotes

"If you are not already aware of it, having papers from the Wurlitzer Company (Rembert Wurlitzer) is as close to the "gold standard" as you can get! So many of today's expert were trained in their workshops and their legacy of quality and integrity is one  that sets the benchmark for American Violin shops today.  It would not be an exaggeration to assert that Rembert Wurlitzer and his company started the "Golden Age of American Violinmaking" that still continues to this day."
"In 1951 Sacconi went with his pupil D’Attili to work for Rembert Wurlitzer. A first-class workshop was built up and many of the best American repairers were trained in it. In his last years Sacconi spent much time teaching in Cremona, Italy, and published I segreti di Stradivari (Cremona, 1972), setting out in detail Stradivari’s working methods." 
"To this day (presently 2009), Rembert Wurlitzer certification is still highly regarded and respected. That says a great deal about his expertise and reputation."

References

Further reading
The Henry Hottinger Collection, Rembert Wurlitzer Inc. 1967
From Violinmaking to Music:The Life & Works of  Simone Fernando Sacconi -  A.C.L.A.P. Cremona
A Thousand Mornings of Music: The Journal of an Obsession with the Violin, by Arnold Gingrich (1970), Crown Publish Co.
Le Celebrazioni Stradivariance a Cremona 1937-1949  Turris Editrice 
Grove Dictionary
  Simone Fernando Sacconi, The Secrets of Stradivari (Cremona:  Libreria Del Convegno, 1979)  reprint by Eric Blot Edizioni
SACCONI,SIMONE FERNANDO - MOSCONI,ANDREA. Simone Fernando Sacconi. Centenary celebration nel centenario della nascita. Cremona, 1995
Loan Exhibition of Stringed Instruments and Bows Commemorating the 70th Birthday of Simone Fernando Sacconi, Schuler Verlagsgesellschaft, Stuttgart, 1966
 Wurlitzer, Rembert
 Dictionnaire Universel del Luthiers - Rene Vannes 1951,1972, 1985 (vol.3)
 Universal Dictionary of Violin & Bow Makers - William Henley 1970
 Rembert Wurlitzer and the travels of antique violins

Bow makers

Bowed string instrument makers
Wurlitzer